The 1947–48 FAW Welsh Cup is the 61st season of the annual knockout tournament for competitive football teams in Wales.

Key
League name pointed after clubs name.
CCL - Cheshire County League
FL D3N - Football League Third Division North
ML - Midland League
SFL - Southern Football League

Fifth round
Six winners from the Fourth round, Llanelly and 13 new clubs.

Sixth round
Four winners from the Fifth round. Six other clubs get a bye to the Seventh round.

Seventh round
Two winners from the Sixth round plus six clubs who get a bye in the previous round.

Semifinal
South Liverpool and Lovell's Athletic played at Shrewsbury, Barry Town and Shrewsbury Town played at Merthyr.

Final
Final were held at Wrexham.

External links
The FAW Welsh Cup

1947-48
Wales
Cup